Walnut Hill Historic District may refer to:

 Walnut Hill Historic District (Carnesville, Georgia), listed on the NRHP in Georgia
 Walnut Hill Historic District (Knightdale, North Carolina), listed on the NRHP in North Carolina